Fåberg is a village in Lillehammer Municipality in Innlandet county, Norway. The village is located in the Gudbrandsdalen valley, along the shore of the Gudbrandsdalslågen river. The European route E6 highway and the Dovrebanen railway line both run through the village. The historic Fåberg Church lies a short distance west of the village, on the other side of the river.

From 1838 to 1964, the village of Fåberg was the administrative centre of the old Fåberg Municipality. In 1964, it was merged into Lillehammer Municipality.

Name
The village was named after the nearby Fåberg farm because the first Fåberg Church was built there. The meaning of the first element is unknown. Prior to 1921, the name was spelled "Faaberg".

References

Lillehammer
Villages in Innlandet
Populated places on the Gudbrandsdalslågen